The Senior men's race at the 2023 World Athletics Cross Country Championships was held at Bathurst, Australia, on February 18, 2023. Jacob Kiplimo from Uganda won the gold medal by 9 seconds over Ethiopian Berihu Aregawi, while Joshua Cheptegei finished third.

Race results

Senior men's race (10 km)

Individual

Team

References 

World Athletics Cross Country Championships